The 2021 Syracuse Orange football team represented Syracuse University during the 2021 NCAA Division I FBS football season. The Orange were led by sixth-year head coach Dino Babers and played their home games at the Carrier Dome, competing as members of the Atlantic Coast Conference.

Previous season

The Orange finished the season 1–10, 1–9 in ACC play to finish fifteenth and last overall in the conference.

Offseason

Offseason departures

NFL draftees

Undrafted free agents

Schedule
The ACC released their schedule on January 28, 2021.

Source:

Game summaries

at Ohio

Rutgers

Albany

Liberty

at Florida State

No. 19 Wake Forest

Clemson

at Virginia Tech

Boston College

at Louisville

at No. 20 NC State

No. 17 Pittsburgh

References

Syracuse
Syracuse Orange football seasons
Syracuse Orange football